Jackson Township, Ohio, may refer to:

Jackson Township, Allen County, Ohio
Jackson Township, Ashland County, Ohio
Jackson Township, Auglaize County, Ohio
Jackson Township, Brown County, Ohio
Jackson Township, Champaign County, Ohio
Jackson Township, Clermont County, Ohio
Jackson Township, Coshocton County, Ohio
Jackson Township, Crawford County, Ohio
Jackson Township, Darke County, Ohio
Jackson Township, Franklin County, Ohio
Jackson Township, Guernsey County, Ohio
Jackson Township, Hancock County, Ohio
Jackson Township, Hardin County, Ohio
Jackson Township, Highland County, Ohio
Jackson Township, Jackson County, Ohio
Jackson Township, Knox County, Ohio
Jackson Township, Mahoning County, Ohio
Jackson Township, Monroe County, Ohio
Jackson Township, Montgomery County, Ohio
Jackson Township, Muskingum County, Ohio
Jackson Township, Noble County, Ohio
Jackson Township, Paulding County, Ohio
Jackson Township, Perry County, Ohio
Jackson Township, Pickaway County, Ohio
Jackson Township, Pike County, Ohio
Jackson Township, Preble County, Ohio
Jackson Township, Putnam County, Ohio
Jackson Township, Richland County, Ohio
Jackson Township, Sandusky County, Ohio
Jackson Township, Seneca County, Ohio
Jackson Township, Shelby County, Ohio
Jackson Township, Stark County, Ohio
Jackson Township, Union County, Ohio
Jackson Township, Van Wert County, Ohio
Jackson Township, Vinton County, Ohio
Jackson Township, Wood County, Ohio
Jackson Township, Wyandot County, Ohio

Ohio township disambiguation pages